Hang is the fifth studio album by American indie rock duo Foxygen, released on January 20, 2017 on Jagjaguwar.

Reception

In a mostly positive review for Pitchfork, Evan Rytlewski praised the album's stylistic departure from its predecessor, ...And Star Power, and its high concept direction: "Hang is the kind of investment of time, money, and patience a band can only make if they intend to stick around for a while, an audacious timpani crash of an album that satirizes its own grandiosity in real time." Writing for NME magazine, Ben Homewood gave the album a positive review, saying "...don’t take this sumptuous fifth record ... as a step towards convention. ‘Hang’ may be crisp, clear and smooth, but Foxygen are still very much a force for chaos."

Track listing

Personnel 
 Sam France – vocals, backing vocals
 Jonathan Rado – guitar, bass guitar, keyboards, percussion

Additional musicians
 Michael D’Addario – percussion
 Brian D’Addario – acoustic guitar, bass guitar, piano
 Trey Pollard – conductor, orchestral arrangements
 Matthew E. White – arranger
 Bryce McCormick – score preparation
 Grace Bauson – harp
 Stephaine Barrett – cello
 Jason McComb – cello
 Shara Stamps – cello
 Treesa Gold – string contractor, violin
 Anna Bishop – violin
 Elise Blake – violin
 Faith Hofma – violin
 Stacy Matthews – violin
 Adrian Pintea – violin
 Melissa Sunderland – violin
 Tom Stevens – viola
 Johanna Beaver – viola
 Pinson Chanselle – chimes, timpani
 Reginald Chapman – trombone
 Scott Flynn – trombone
 Bryan Hooten – trombone
 Toby Whitaker – trombone
 JC Kuhl – saxophone (tenor)
 Suzi Fischer – saxophone
 Kevin Simpson – saxophone
 Bob Miller – flugelhorn, trumpet
 Rob Quallich – flugelhorn, trumpet
 Taylor Barnett – flugelhorn, trumpet
 Marcus Tenney – flugelhorn, trumpet
 Rick Reiger – clarinet, saxophone
 Jason Scott – clarinet, saxophone
 John Winn – clarinet, saxophone
 Lauren Serpa – flute
 Anthony Smith – flute, piccolo flute
 Laura Smith – oboe
 Victoria Hamrick – English horn, oboe
 Erin Lano – French horn
 Rachel Velvikis – French horn
 Amanda Winger – French horn
 Stephanie Ycaza – tuba

Production
 Foxygen – production
 Adrian Olsen – engineer
 Michael Harris – engineer
 Christopher Cerullo – assistant engineer
 Cian Riordan – mixing
 Bob Ludwig – mastering

References

2017 albums
Foxygen albums
Jagjaguwar albums
Albums produced by Jonathan Rado
Albums recorded at Electro-Vox Recording Studios